Lillpite is a locality situated in Piteå Municipality, Norrbotten County, Sweden with 429 inhabitants in 2010.

Sports
The following sports clubs are located in Lillpite:

 Lillpite IF

References

External links

Populated places in Piteå Municipality
Norrbotten